Anoreina roosevelti is a species of beetle in the family Cerambycidae. It was described by Vanessa S. Machado and Marcela L. Monné in 2011.

References

Acanthoderini
Beetles described in 2011